Primehook Beach (also known as Shorts Beach) is an unincorporated community in Sussex County, Delaware, United States. Primehook Beach is located along the Delaware Bay, east of the Prime Hook National Wildlife Refuge at the end of Prime Hook Road, to the northeast of Milton.

References

Unincorporated communities in Sussex County, Delaware
Unincorporated communities in Delaware
Beaches of Delaware